Lord Jim is a 1965 British adventure film made for Columbia Pictures in Super Panavision. The picture was produced and directed by Richard Brooks with Jules Buck and Peter O'Toole as associate producers, from a screenplay by Brooks. The film stars O'Toole, James Mason, Curd Jürgens, Eli Wallach, Jack Hawkins, Paul Lukas, and Daliah Lavi.

It is the second film adaptation of the 1900 novel of the same name by Joseph Conrad. The first was a silent film released in 1925 and directed by Victor Fleming. The film received two BAFTA nominations, for best British art direction and best British cinematography. The film had its world premiere on 15 February 1965 at the Odeon Leicester Square in the West End of London as the Royal Film Performance in the presence of Queen Elizabeth, the Queen Mother; Princess Margaret, Countess of Snowdon; and the Earl of Snowdon.

Plot
The story begins on a fully rigged naval training ship for cadets.

Jim is a promising young English merchant seaman who rises to first officer under Captain Marlow. However, Jim is injured and left at Java. When he is fit again, he signs on with the first available ship, a dilapidated freighter called the SS Patna, crammed with hundreds of Muslims on a pilgrimage to Mecca. When a storm threatens the leaking ship, the crew panics and takes to the lifeboats, abandoning their passengers; in a moment of weakness, Jim joins them.

When they reach port, the sailors are stunned to find an intact Patna already there before them. The rest of the crew disappears, but Jim insists on confessing his guilt at an official inquiry and is stripped of his sailing papers. Filled with self-loathing, Jim becomes a drifter.

One day, he saves a boatload of gunpowder from sabotage. Stein, the cargo's owner, offers him an extremely dangerous job: transporting it and some rifles by river to distant Patusan to help Stein's old friend, the town's chief, lead an uprising against bandits led by a local warlord named The General.

When Schomberg is bribed to deny Stein the use of the motorboat he had promised, Jim takes a sailboat with two native crewmen, leaving the aged Stein behind. As they near their destination, one of the crewmen reveals himself to be working for the General. He kills the other sailor and flees to warn the General. Jim manages to hide the cargo before he is captured.

Jim is tortured but refuses to divulge the location. This surprises Cornelius, the drunken, cowardly agent of Stein's trading company who has joined the general. That night, the Girl leads Jim's rescue.

Jim distributes the arms and plans the attack on the General's stockade. He is assisted by Waris, the chief Du-Ramin's son. After much bloody fighting, Jim delivers the crushing blow, pushing a barrel of gunpowder through a hail of bullets into the bandits' final stronghold, blowing it up along with the General. Only Cornelius survives, hiding in a secret underground room with the General's hidden treasure. Jim is hailed as a hero. Du-Ramin bestows the title tuan on him, which translates as "Lord".

Jim is content to live in Patusan with the Girl. Cornelius and Schomberg recruit notorious cut-throat "Gentleman" Duncan Brown and his men to steal the treasure, and in the course of this they are detected and cornered. At an impasse, Brown offers to leave peacefully, but the village does not trust him. Jim insists they be allowed to go, offering his own life as forfeit if anyone is killed as a result. As Brown and his men feign to leave, under cover of heavy fog, they make one last attempt at the treasure. Waris and Jim dispatch them, although Waris is mortally wounded.

Afterward, Stein pleads with Du-Ramin to spare Jim. Du-Ramin agrees if Jim leaves the following morning. Stein urges Jim to leave, but he refuses. The following morning as the funeral procession for the dead villagers starts, Jim walks up to Du-Ramin and waits, taking in the village's beauty. Du-Ramin shoots him and Jim's body is added to the procession, which ends in the cremation of the dead.

Cast
 Peter O'Toole as Lord Jim
 James Mason as Gentleman Brown
 Curd Jürgens as Cornelius
 Eli Wallach as The General
 Jack Hawkins as Marlow
 Paul Lukas as Stein
 Daliah Lavi as The Girl
 Akim Tamiroff as Schomberg
 Jūzō Itami as Waris
 Tatsuo Saitō as Du-Ramin
 Andrew Keir as Brierly
 Jack MacGowran as Robinson
 Eric Young as Malay
 Noel Purcell as Captain Chester
 Walter Gotell as Captain of Patna
 Marne Maitland as Elder
 A. J. Brown as Magistrate
 Christian Marquand as the French Officer

Production
Brooks optioned the novel in 1957. The film was made at Shepperton Studios, England, and on location in Angkor Wat, Cambodia; Hong Kong; and Malacca, Malaysia. In a 1971 interview, O'Toole spoke of some of the difficulties of location filming:

"The three months we spent in Cambodia were dreadful. Sheer hell. A nightmare. There we were, all of us, knee deep in lizards and all kinds of horrible insects. And everyone hating us. Awful."

It was photographed in Super Panavision 70 by Freddie Young. The music score by Bronisław Kaper featured the use of gamelan musicians. The crew and cast of the film were joined by Cambodian translator Dith Pran, who was a liaison between Cambodians and the film-makers and cast. Later, he left the country after the 1975 Communist takeover and his own imprisonment, which were told in the 1984 film The Killing Fields with Haing S. Ngor as Pran.

Reception
The film opened to bad reviews and to minimal box-office returns.
Bosley Crowther of the New York Times called Lord Jim a "big, gaudy, clanging color film" that "misses at being either Conrad or sheer entertainment cinema." Neither was he satisfied with O'Toole's performance, characterising it as "so sullen, soggy, and uncertain, especially toward the end, that it is difficult to find an area of recognisable sensitivity in which one can make contact with him." Variety was equally critical, stating "Brooks has teetered between making it a full-blooded, no-holds-barred adventure yarn and the fascinating psychological study that Conrad wrote." O'Toole's performance was described as "self-indulgent and lacking in real depth." The consensus was that Brooks, who did good dramas about people, did not have what it took to make a classic story. O'Toole, however, later stood by the film; he said the role of Lord Jim was the finest role he ever did.

Cambodian Head of State and former King Norodom Sihanouk did not like the film's portrayal of Cambodia. Thus, by 1966 he countered it by making the film Apsara, which was his first feature-length and color film.

The film holds a 57% rating on Rotten Tomatoes based on reviews from 14 critics. The score was nominated for the American Film Institute's 2005 list AFI's 100 Years of Film Scores.

Lord Jim was preserved by the Academy Film Archive in 2000.

Comic book adaption
 Gold Key: Lord Jim (September 1965)

References

External links
 
 
 
 

1965 films
1960s historical adventure films
British historical adventure films
Columbia Pictures films
1960s English-language films
Films adapted into comics
Films based on British novels
Films based on works by Joseph Conrad
Films directed by Richard Brooks
Films scored by Bronisław Kaper
Films set in Cambodia
Films set in the 1880s
Films set in the 1890s
Seafaring films
1960s British films
Films shot in Cambodia
Films shot in Malacca
Films shot in Hong Kong